The Royal Moroccan Tennis Federation (often shortened as FRMT for its French acronym Fédération Royale Marocaine de Tennis) is the national governing body of Tennis in Morocco. It was founded in 1957. It is currently presided by Fayçal Laraichi, a close collaborator of Mohammed VI and the chairman of the state-owned television and radio SNRT.

Presidents
Ahmed Djibli (1957–1964)
Mohamed Mjid (1964–2009)
Fayçal Laraichi (2009–)

References

External links
FRMT.ma

National members of the Confederation of African Tennis
Tennis in Morocco
Tennis
1957 establishments in Morocco